The Ulbricht Group was a group of exiled members of the Communist Party of Germany (Kommunistische Partei Deutschlands, or KPD), led by Walter Ulbricht, who flew from the Soviet Union back to Germany on April 30, 1945. Composed of functionaries from the KPD and ten anti-fascist prisoners of war, their job was to seek out anti-fascist individuals and prepare the groundwork for the re-establishment of communist organizations and unions in postwar Berlin. There were two additional regional groups, the Ackermann Group in Saxony and the Sobottka Group in Mecklenburg. Many of the group's members later became high-level officials in the government of the German Democratic Republic (GDR).

Political operation 
The tasks for the Ulbricht Group and the other communist cadre who were to return to Germany were defined at a meeting between Wilhelm Pieck and Georgi Dimitrov held in Moscow on April 25, 1945. Dimitrov was then a high-level functionary of the Central Committee of the Communist Party of the Soviet Union, working as the assistant division leader of the International Information Division. They were to prepare the region to accept and follow the instructions of the Soviet Military Administration in Germany so the Nazi government could be dismantled. The de-nazification process was to convince the people to turn over Nazi war criminals. The Group was to calm people and assure them that the Red Army would neither destroy nor enslave them, but that the German people had to understand that they bore the responsibility for the Nazi's rise to power, giving force to Hitler's policies and causing the catastrophe. The communists had tried to warn them of the coming catastrophe and they were now there to help them out of their distress and at the same time, establish a basis for the future of the Communist Party of Germany (KPD). They were also to seek out anti-fascist individuals who would be willing to work with the new organizations. The youngest member of the group was 24-year-old Wolfgang Leonhard.

The Ulbricht Group left from the Hotel Lux, where they had been living in exile, some for years, and flew from Moscow to Minsk, then to Calau, near Międzyrzecz. Not all members of the group knew what their assignment was or how long it would last until after they landed. They landed in an airfield and were met by a Soviet officer, who drove away with Ulbricht. The Ulbricht Group began working from there on May 2, 1945, though not much could be done with the city in flames after the Battle of Berlin. In the evening, Ulbricht met with the group and explained their assignment. They were to cover all 20 districts in Berlin and begin building local administrations. In each, they were to seek out as many social democrats as possible, also a civil servant with a Ph.D from each local administration who was willing to work with the Soviets and a cleric to lead a religious advisory council. Communists were to be installed in each district as assistant administrator, and to head up the departments for personnel and development. The group worked from Bruchmühle till May 8, after which they moved to the Friedrichsfelde area of Berlin.

On May 6, 1945, Ulbricht gave the Soviet commander of Berlin, Nikolai Berzarin, the first list of suggested names to fill important administrative posts in Berlin. On May 12, 1945, the district administrators and city councils were appointed from Ulbricht's list without exception. Paul Markgraf, one of the ten anti-fascist prisoners of war, was appointed the "Berlin Police President", also on Ulbricht's initiative.

In the beginning of June 1945, Ulbricht, Ackermann and Sobottka traveled back to Moscow to give the first reports and get their further instructions. On June 4, 1945, they met with Pieck, Joseph Stalin and Andrei Zhdanov. Stalin urged them to found a nationwide working class party that would remain open for the proletariat, farmers and intellectuals. He wanted the party to work for a unified Germany and said in his opinion, the West wanted to split the country into partitions, so, according to Pieck, their goal was to "[complete] the civil-democratic revolution through a civil-democratic government." The founding manifesto of the KPD was written by Ackermann. In it, the new party spoke openly against a sovietization of Germany. It said the goal was to "continue to its conclusion the civil-democratic transformation begun with the revolutions of 1848" and through land reform, to eliminate the "remnants of feudalism". The goal the Party named was as the "establishment of an anti-fascist, democratic republic with all democratic rights and freedoms for the people". With the re-establishment of the KPD on June 11, 1945, the Ulbricht Group reached its first goal. On July 10, 1945, it moved into the KPD's Central Committee building.

Existence concealed 
Until 1955 and the publication of Wolfgang Leonhard's book, Die Revolution entläßt ihre Kinder (later published in English as Child of the Revolution), knowledge of the Ulbricht Group was kept secret. In Leonhard's opinion, it was kept secret so as not to emphasize the role of communist exiles from Moscow in the establishment of the GDR. After 1955, several versions of the story appeared regarding the composition of the group and the order of events leading to the appointments.

There is disagreement among historians as to whether or not Stalin and Ackermann were earnest in their affirmation of parliamentarian democracy and fundamental rights. Leonhard reported the oft-cited comment by Ulbricht made during this period, "It is quite clear. It must look democratic, but we must have everything in hand." Some historians say that by spring 1945, the establishment of a communist-dominated government in the Soviet-occupied zone and the proclaimed democracy was merely a transitional stage but at least one historian believes that Stalin earnestly pursued a western-style democracy for Germany, that it was the only way he could secure the responsibility from the others, which without him, would easily have been able to deny access to the resources of the Ruhr region, reparations he desperately needed as resources to rebuild the war-ravaged western regions of the Soviet Union.

Members
 Walter Ulbricht (1893–1973), first secretary of the Socialist Unity Party of Germany, 1950 to 1971; chairman of the State Council of the German Democratic Republic, 1960 to 1973
 Fritz Erpenbeck (1897–1975), National Committee for a Free Germany (from 1943)
 Karl Maron (1903–1975), co-editor of the newspaper Freies Deutschland from 1943; later, assistant chief editor of the newspaper, Neues Deutschland and Interior Minister of the GDR
 Hans Mahle (1911–1999), editor of the German-language Moscow radio broadcasts, later chief editor of the newspaper, Schweriner Volkszeitung
 Walter Köppe (1891–1970), administrative director of the Bauakademie Berlin until 1955, employed at the Ministry for Heavy Machinery Construction
 Richard Gyptner (1901–1972), secretary to Comintern General Secretary Georgi Dimitrov, 1933–1935; editor at radio Deutscher Volkssender in Moscow; head of the Capitalist Foreign Countries division (Kapitalistisches Ausland) of the GDR's Foreign Ministry and diplomat
 Wolfgang Leonhard (1921–2014; went by the name Vladimir Leonhard), graduate of the Comintern school and radio announcer at Freies Deutschland; broke with Stalinism in 1949, fled to Yugoslavia, then to the Federal Republic of Germany
 Otto Winzer (1902–1975), Moscow pseudonym: Otto Lorenz; chief of staff for GDR President Wilhelm Pieck until 1956; Foreign Minister of the GDR, 1965 to 1975
 Gustav Gundelach (1888–1962), editor and radio announcer at Deutscher Volkssender in Moscow; KPD representative of the first German Bundestag
 Otto Fischer (1901–1974), worked at radio Berliner Rundfunk

Regional groups 
The group for Saxony was led by Anton Ackermann:

 Anton Ackermann (1905–1973), went by the name "Peter Ackermann", as he was most often called in Moscow)
 Hermann Matern (1893–1971)
 Fred Oelßner (1903–1977), known as "Fred Larew"
 Kurt Fischer (1900–1950)
 Heinrich Greif (1907–1946)
 Peter Florin (1921–2014), deputy representative to the United Nations
 Franz Greiner
 Egon Dräger
 Artur Hofmann (1907–1987)
 Georg Wolff (1882–1968)

The group for Mecklenburg was led by Gustav Sobottka:

 Gustav Sobottka (1886–1953), East German politician
 Gottfried Grünberg (1899–1985)
 Willi Bredel (1901–1964)
 Stanislaw Switalla
 Arthur Fiedler
 Georg Kamann
 Rudolf Herrnstadt (1903–1966), replaced Kurt Bürger (1894–1951) who was originally supposed to be in the group
 Karl Raab (1906–1992)
 Oskar Stefan
 Herbert Hentschke
 Walter Offermann
 Bruno Schramm

Sources 
 Wolfgang Leonhard, Die Revolution entlässt ihre Kinder. Kiepenheuer und Witsch, Cologne (1955), Wilhelm Heyne Verlag, Munich (1985)
 Wolfgang Leonhard, Spurensuche. 40 Jahre nach 'Die Revolution entlässt ihre Kinder'. Kiepenheuer und Witsch, Cologne (1992–94)

Footnotes

References

External links
Documents and photos of the Ulbricht Group in the German Federal Archives 
Aufruf des Zentralkomitees der Kommunistischen Partei Deutschlands vom 11. Juni 1945 (PDF) German Historical Institute, Washington, D.C. 
Wolfgang Zank, "Als Stalin Demokratie befahl" Die Zeit (June 16, 1995). Retrieved December 6, 2011

Communist organisations in Germany
Communist Party of Germany
Germany–Soviet Union relations
History of East Germany
Politics of East Germany
Politics of World War II